Komazawa Gymnasium is an indoor sporting arena located in Komazawa Olympic Park, Tokyo, Japan. The capacity of the arena is 3,875 spectators.

Designed by Japanese architect Yoshinobu Ashihara, along with the landmark Control Tower, that features as a focal point of the park. The gymnasium venue hosted the wrestling events at the 1964 Summer Olympics.

References

1964 Summer Olympics official report. Volume 1. pp. 125–6.

Basketball venues in Japan
Venues of the 1964 Summer Olympics
Olympic wrestling venues
Indoor arenas in Japan
Volleyball venues in Japan
Sports venues in Tokyo
Buildings and structures in Setagaya
Sports venues completed in 1964
1964 establishments in Japan
Alvark Tokyo